The White Night (French: La nuit blanche) is a 1948 French drama film directed by Richard Pottier and starring Pierre Brasseur, Claude Farell and Jimmy Gaillard.

The film's sets were designed by the art director Paul-Louis Boutié.

Cast
 Pierre Brasseur as Pierre Taverny 
 Claude Farell as Cécilia 
 Jimmy Gaillard as L'inspecteur Legrand 
 Jacques Dacqmine as Jacques Davenne 
 Pierre Larquey as Emile 
 Arlette Merry as Jasmine 
 André Brunot as Lestrade 
 Jean Charpini as Le couturier J.P. Hyacinthe 
 Henri Bosc as Le directeur de la P.J 
 Jacqueline Duc as La concierge

References

Bibliography 
 Parish, Robert. Film Actors Guide. Scarecrow Press, 1977.

External links 
 

1948 films
French drama films
1948 drama films
1940s French-language films
Films directed by Richard Pottier
French black-and-white films
1940s French films